The Bauang Diesel Power Plant (BDPP) is a diesel-powered electricity generator in Bauang, La Union, Philippines.

History
The Bauang Diesel Power Plant (BDPP) is a result of a build-operate-transfer (BOT) agreement between the private consortium First Private Power Corp. (FPPC) and the state-owned National Power Corporation (NPC) in 1993. FPPC was formed by Meralco, First Philippine Holdings, JG Summit Holdings and PCI Capital in response to a power crisis in the 1990s. The FPPC incorporated the Bauang Private Power Corporation (BPPC) to maintain and operate the power plant after its completion. The BDDP was commissioned on July 25, 1995.

Upon the expiry of the BOT deal in July 2010, the BPPC turned over the facility back to the national government, specifically to the Power Sector Assets and
Liabilities Management Corporation (PSALM) and the NPC. PSALM-NPC, turned over the facility to the provincial government of La Union.

In 2019, the property associated with the power plant was acquired by the local government of La Union.

The BDPP is operated by Bauang-based 1590 Energy Corporation, which is a subsidiary of the Vivant Corporation.

References

Oil-fired power stations in the Philippines
Buildings and structures in La Union